Chahu Genow may refer to:
 Chahu Genow-e Pain